Elijah Garcia (born March 11, 1998) is an American football defensive end for the Denver Broncos of the National Football League (NFL). He played college football at Rice Owls.

Professional career

Los Angeles Rams
After not being selected in the 2022 NFL Draft, Garcia signed with the Los Angeles Rams as an undrafted free agent on April 30. On August 30, during the final roster cuts, Garcia was waived, but re-signed to the practice squad the next day.

Denver Broncos
On December 7, the Denver Broncos signed Garcia off the Rams practice squad. He made his NFL debut on January 1 against the Kansas City Chiefs, playing seven snaps.

References 

1998 births
Living people
Rice Owls football players
American football defensive ends
Los Angeles Rams players
Denver Broncos players